Heading to the Ground, also known as No Limit is a 2009 South Korean television series starring Jung Yun-ho, Go Ara, Lee Yoon-ji, and Lee Sang-yoon. It aired on MBC on Wednesdays to Thursdays at 21:55 for 16 episodes beginning September 9, 2009.

Plot
The drama about a man trying to achieve what is thought to be impossible: fulfilling his dreams of being a great soccer player. He meets Kang Hae Bin, a sports agent who tries to live her life away from the influence of her rich father.

Cast
 Jung Yun-ho as Cha Bong-gun
Jung Chan-woo as young Cha Bong-gun
 Go Ara as Kang Hae-bin
 Lee Yoon-ji as Oh Yeon-yi
 Lee Sang-yoon as Jang Seung-woo

Supporting 
 Bang Joon-seo as Cha Byul-yi
 Park Soon-chun as Lee Soon-ok (Byul-yi's mother)
 Yoon Yeo-jung as Ae-ja
 Im Chae-moo as Kang Sung-il (Hae-bin's father)
 Lee Il-hwa as Maeng Geum-hee (Hae-bin's stepmother)
 Kim Hye-ok as (Yeon-yi's mother)
 Seung Hyo-bin as Mi-kyeong	
 Park Chul-min as Hong Sang-an
 Lee Seung-shin as Han Myung-kil
 Park Hwi-soon as Young-dal
 Choi Eun-young as Mi Kyung
 Go Soo-hee as Heo Sook-hee
 Jung Joon-ha
 Im Seung-dae as team leader Moon

Extended

Soccer team
 Kim Jae-seung as Lee Dong-ho
 Lee Jae-yoon as Shin Poong-chul
 Choi Min-sung as Jo Byung-ki
 Hong Jong-hyun as Hong Kyung-rae
 Kang Shin-il as Lee Choong-ryul (coach)
 Ricky Kim as Maxim
 Yoon Won-suk as Yong-goo
 Kim Kwang-min

Others
 Yum Dong-hun as Geun-choon (cameo)

References

External links
  

MBC TV television dramas
2009 South Korean television series debuts
2009 South Korean television series endings
Korean-language television shows
South Korean sports television series
South Korean romantic comedy television series
Association football television series
Television series by SM C&C